Colonel Muhammad Qasim Malik S.I.(M) (b. 1957) is a Pakistani soldier and calligrapher. He has held two calligraphy exhibitions, the first of which was inaugurated by Pervez Musharraf, and the second which was inaugurated by Irfan Ahmed Khan, President of the Pakistan Calligraph-Artists' Guild in Islamabad.

Col Qasim Malik has had no formal training in this particular field of art. He started off with making a few oil paintings of different scenes, which were very cleverly done and earned him high praise from his peers. This led to a deepening of passion for his newfound hobby and he excelled in making scenic paintings which can be considered masterpieces in their own right. He matured with every scene that he painted and soon became a master artist.  

With time, he changed his style of painting and became more focused towards the branch of art called calligraphy. It is in this field where by far he has excelled and literally produced contemporary masterpieces which are any calligraphy enthusiast's dream. Col Qasim, in this regard has to be given credit for being the first person who has successfully been able to produce on hardboard, with oil paints, verses of the Quran in Khat-e-Suls. The oil paints are perhaps the most difficult medium to paint with and consequently, are extensively used in abstract art. It is this new exciting presentation of the Quranic verses in such preciseness which has dumbfounded many a critic.

Speaking at the inauguration of Col Qasim's exhibition Mr. Irfan Ahmed Khan, President Calligraphic Association of Pakistan, remarked, "I find Col Qasim’s method of painting highly unusual, however the results of his creations continue to baffle me and I am amazed at the simplicity and the uniqueness of his work." In Col Qasim's paintings, the elements of pure and basic calligraphy are clear and apparent. The use of Khat-e-Suls, (which has also been used by renowned Muslim architects and artists in decorating the two Holy Mosques, and different Muslim Architecture around the world, throughout the ages) gives his paintings depth and a look of conventional Muslim art whilst clearly depicting the modern methods of painting and styling. The most important aspect of his paintings is the fact that they are basically two paintings combined into one. Col Qasim paints out the background first, and then on top, paints the Holy Verses from the Quran. This element of modernity has been the underlying principle in his success.

Two things that clearly stuck to the mind after the exhibition were the rich fluidity and creativeness of the artist, who even though he could not follow his hobby into full-time profession, still retains the vestiges of perhaps becoming one of the finest calligraphers Pakistan has at this point in time.

Col Qasim has so far hosted two successful calligraphy exhibitions. The first of these exhibitions was inaugurated by the former President of Pakistan, General Pervez Musharraf. Some of Col Qasim's finest paintings have been requisitioned for the Faisal Mosque, whilst the former President of Pakistan is also a famous customer of this budding artist.

References

Calligraphers of Arabic script
Pakistan Army officers
Pakistani calligraphers
Living people
Year of birth missing (living people)